Nero is the seventh studio album by Polish gothic rock band Closterkeller. It was released on October 16, 2003 in Poland through Metal Mind Productions. The album was recorded on August–September 2003 at Zeman-Krason studio. The cover art was created by Agnieszka Szuba. An English version of the album was released on February 23, 2004 in the United States and the Netherlands through Bertus Distributie, Pitchfork Promotions.

Track listing

Bonus Tracks

Track listing (English release)

Personnel
 Anja Orthodox - vocal, synthesizer, lyrics
 Marcin Mentel  - guitar
 Marcin Płuciennik  - bass
 Gerard Klawe - percussion
 Michał Rollinger - keyboards
Music - Closterkeller.

Music videos
 "Poza granicą dotyku" (2003)
 "Ktokolwiek widział" (2004)
 "Królowa" (2004)

Release history

Original release

English release

References

2003 albums
Closterkeller albums
Polish-language albums